Rubber Chemistry and Technology is a quarterly peer-reviewed scientific journal covering fundamental research and technical developments relating to chemistry, materials science, and engineering of rubber, elastomers, and related materials. It was established in 1928, with Carroll C. Davis as its first editor-in-chief. The current editor-in-chief is Christopher G. Robertson. The journal is published by the American Chemical Society's Rubber Division.
The journal currently publishes four issues per year containing original research contributions and review articles.

Abstracting and indexing
The journal is abstracted indexed in:

According to the Journal Citation Reports, the journal has a 2021 impact factor of 2.081.

Past editors
The following persons have been editors-in-chief of the journal:
Christopher G. Robertson (Polymer Technology Services; July 2020-present)
William V. Mars, (Endurica; 2010-June 2020)
Krishna Baranwal (Akron Rubber Development Lab; 2002-2009)
Frederick Ignatz-Hoover, (Monsanto; 2000-2001)
C. Michael Roland (U.S. Naval Research Laboratory; 1991-1999)
Gary Hamed (University of Akron; 1984-1990)
Aubert Y. Coran (Monsanto; 1978-1983)
Karl Frensdorff (E. I. du Pont de Nemours; 1975-1977)
Earl C. Gregg (B. F. Goodrich; 1969-1974)
Edward Bevilacqua (U.S. Rubber, Wayne Research Center; 1965-1968)
David Craig, (B. F. Goodrich; 1957-1964)
Carroll C. Davis (Boston Woven Hose Co.; 1928-1956)

References

External links

Engineering journals
Materials science journals
American Chemical Society academic journals
Publications established in 1928
English-language journals
Quarterly journals
Rubber